Queen Elizabeth II Court is the city block containing Regina City Hall, a 16-storey office tower in Regina, Saskatchewan, Canada. The city hall is built in the International Style.

Opened in 1976, "[t]he construction manager was Poole Construction Limited and the architect, Joseph Pettick. It cost ." It replaced two previous city halls—built in 1885-86 and 1908—and a temporary one in the old post office on 11th Avenue at Cornwall Street.

By the time the cornerstone was laid in 1906 for the second, the "gingerbread city hall," "[t]he wooden building which had served as Town Hall and as Regina's first City Hall was no longer sufficient for the city's needs. This is not surprising, since the tiny wooden building was used as City Chambers, the police station, the fire hall, a school, a public meeting hall and a banquet hall."

The 1908 building "was grand in scope and size, emphasizing the confidence city fathers saw in the future of the city. Built on 11th Avenue between Hamilton and Rose Streets (where the Alvin Hamilton Building housing Service Canada now stands), the new building was ornately decorated. It was often known as 'The Gingerbread Palace.' Constructed between 1906 -1908, it came into use in 1908 as a city hall, centre of arts, music and literature, and a banquet hall. Like its wooden predecessor, the massive stone structure was used for everything from lectures to dances – even boxing matches were held within its hallowed walls. However, by 1963, the revered old hall was showing its age and all civic offices were moved to the Old Post Office building. The building sat vacant for two years until it was demolished in 1965 to make room for the Galleria Shopping Centre (renamed the Alvin Hamilton Building)."

The temporary city hall in the old post office (the "Prince Edward Building"), was used as a substitute from 1963 to 1975 for the city hall on 11th Avenue between Hamilton and Rose Streets, which had been closed and demolished without plans for any long-term replacement. It is most substantially used as theatre by Globe Theatre, Regina. The current City Hall does not contain or provide facilities for public social and ceremonial activities as its 1910 predecessor did, they not being available elsewhere in Regina then but now are. The current building is far more largely for office work.

The City of Regina in 2002 undertook an energy efficiency audit and environmental upgrade to the building.

External links
Skyscraperpage

References 

Buildings and structures in Regina, Saskatchewan
Buildings and structures completed in 1976
City and town halls in Saskatchewan
Joseph Pettick buildings
1976 establishments in Saskatchewan